Daniel Garcia Felicione Napoleão (born January 18, 1995), known professionally as Gloria Groove, is a Brazilian singer, rapper, songwriter, actor, voice actor, and drag queen. Napoleão's singing career began when he was 7 years old, as a member of children's musical group Turma do Balão Mágico. During his childhood, Groove starred in the RecordTV telenovela Savage, and began work as a voice actor. After a period working in theatre as a teenager, Napoleão adopted the drag persona "Gloria Groove" in 2014. Two years later, he started gaining prominence by appearing in the TV Globo reality show Amor & Sexo.

Gloria Groove's singing career launched with the release of the single "Dona" in January 2016. After its success, Groove released "Império", and was featured in Carnival hit "Catuaba" by Aretuza Lovi. Groove's first album, O Proceder, was released in February 2017 and was followed by the singles "Gloriosa" and "Muleke Brasileiro". At the end of 2017, Groove released one of the most successful singles of her career, "Bumbum de Ouro". It was followed by peer recognition, which led the singer to feature in several singles such as "Joga Bunda", along with Lovi and Pabllo Vittar, "Arrasta" with Léo Santana, a remix version of Anitta's "Show das Poderosas", and Lexa's "Provocar".

Biography

1995–2016: Early life and career
Daniel Garcia Felicione Napoleão was born on January 18, 1995, in São Paulo, to a family of artists. Daniel grew up in the Vila Formosa neighborhood, where he accompanied his mother, Gina Garcia, during her shows. Daniel's mother was a backing vocal for pagode group Raça Negra, while his aunt was also a singer and his maternal grandparents were circus performers. Inspired by his mother, Daniel recalls singing since he was 4. When he was 6, he starred in advertisements for Elma Chips (Brazilian counterpart to Lay's). He then auditioned in the program , when he was 7, to become part of the band Turma do Balão Mágico (known as "Galera do Balão" at the time); he was a member of the musical act between 7 and 9 years. After performing in Programa Raul Gil as part of a children's gospel group, the ten-year-old Daniel competed at the talent show host by the program. He only competed for two weeks because he was selected to star in the Rede Record telenovela Bicho do Mato (2006–2007). Daniel started his career as a voice actor in this period; one of the major roles was to dub Rico Suave in Hannah Montana.

Daniel grew up feeling he was different and was bullied in school. He also attended the Protestant church Reborn in Christ through his childhood until his teenage years and in the church, he learned about soul music and black music. He gradually stopped going to church as he started working in theatre at the age of 14 and came out as gay. During this time, he played the role of Margaret Mead in an independent stage performance of Hair. Inspired by the play's themes, he decided to create a drag queen persona. The theatre made him appreciate the possibility of mixing music, performance, dance, makeup and costume. Watching RuPaul's Drag Race, he concluded he could do his performances not only in the theatre, but also on clubs and shows. At 17–18, he adopted the stage name "Gloria Groove", chosen after how hymns are called in Brazilian Protestant churches and the musical term of the same name associated with black music.

Groove worked as "coach" in "Bishow", a segment in the TV Globo program Amor e Sexo in which contestants competed as drag queens. Although the filming lasted until November 2015, the show was only broadcast between January and February 2016.

2016–present: debut as a singer and first album
Gloria Groove started a career as a singer by releasing the single "Dona" in January 2016 through the label SB Music. It was followed by the song's music video directed by João Monteiro in March; it was a hit, being watched 1.7 million times in a year. In August, Groove released the single, "Império", whose music video was released in October and was also directed by Monteiro. In November, Groove was featured in Aretuza Lovi's single "Catuaba", which was a moderate success in Brazilian Carnival. First announced as an extended play to be released in March 2016, Groove released the eight-track album O Proceder in February 2017. To promote the album, Groove announced the release of single versions for "Gloriosa" and "Muleke Brasileiro". The former's music video was released in June, and it was released along with "Dona" and "Império" in a mash-up version by ONErpm in November. The latter's music video, directed by Rafael Kent, was released in November, while its single version was published by SB Music in December. Groove was also among the singers chosen to perform "Filhos do Arco-Íris", a single released in June 2017 whose profit was destined to amfAR, The Foundation for AIDS Research.

Since November 2017, Groove is producing a second album. In December 2017, Groove released the first single for the upcoming album, "Bumbum de Ouro", one of the singer's most successful songs and a hit during Carnival. It gained more popularity when the music video directed by Os Primos was released in February 2018; it reached the top of Spotify Brazil's viral chart, and the video was watched over 5 million times on YouTube in three weeks. In January 2018, Groove was featured on Aretuza Lovi's single "Joga Bunda" along with Pabllo Vittar; its music video directed by Felipe Sassi got more than 10 million views on YouTube in a month. In May 2018, Groove released "Arrasta", produced by Os Catioros and featuring axé singer Léo Santana. As a fan, Groove was the one who decided to invite Santana and hoped the partnership would help to reach a wider public. The music video for "Arrasta" was directed by Sassi and was released in June. In the same month, Groove was featured in a remix version of "Show das Poderosas", released by Anitta as part of a Warner Music campaign for the LGBT Pride Month.

Groove's next single, "Apaga a Luz", was released in September 2018 and its music video directed by Sassi was made available in October. A romantic R&B song, it was turned into a commentary on abusive relationships by Sassi. In November, the singer was featured in Lexa's single and music video "Provocar". In January, Groove released the single "Coisa Boa", produced by Pablo Bispo, Sergio Santos and Ruxell. Inspired by Brazilian political context with the election of Jair Bolsonaro, a music video was filmed in a defunct prison after a suggestion by director Sassi. The video was influenced by Lady Gaga's "Telephone" and Orange Is the New Black and was watched by over a million and a half viewers in two days.

Artistry and public image
Daniel defines the "Gloria Groove" persona as "half drag, half rapper", and Groove's compositions vary from soul, trap, R&B, and Brazilian funk. The singer is also known for performing and singing both as "male rapper" and a "female queer"; for example, the singer does this in the music videos for "Dona", "Império", "Bumbum de Ouro", and "Apaga a Luz". As a "queer, effeminate, a non-white drag queen.", Groove's career as a singer is a way to "use my own voice to point out what's wrong [in Brazil]". Since the first song, "Dona", Groove showed this feature with sarcastic lines such as "Oh My Lord / What animal is that? / Nice to meet you, my name is art, darling". The singer aims to represent the LGBT community: "My music hopes to signify the existence of thousands of LGBTIQ people—our music becomes a platform of love and self-acceptance."

At first, Groove did not intend to be labeled as a "drag rapper", but later thought it could be something that differentiates the singer's work. While O Proceder was considered to be mostly a rap work, it already included songs that mix rap and pop as "Muleke Brasileiro", also said to be a "Reggaeton-like song". The following song, "Bumbum de Ouro", was deemed entirely pop with a funk inspiration. The singer did it consciously, hoping to achieve a wider public and it was meant to be the kickoff for the release of a pop-focused album.

Groove has been described as LGBT "idol" by Brazilian media. The singer was featured in "Rain Power", a photo essay published in the August 2017 issue of the Brazilian edition of Vogue magazine. Despite this label, Groove's songs have also been popular among the non-LGBT public. Gloria identifies as non-binary.

Discography

Albums

Songs and music videos

Filmography

Films

Television

Notes

References

External links
 
 

1995 births
21st-century Brazilian singers
Brazilian drag queens
Brazilian voice actors
Brazilian rappers
Gay singers
Brazilian LGBT singers
Brazilian non-binary actors
Living people
Actors from São Paulo
20th-century Brazilian LGBT people
21st-century Brazilian LGBT people
LGBT people in Latin music
Non-binary drag performers
Non-binary singers
Genderfluid people